Creative Commons is maintaining a content directory wiki of organizations and projects using Creative Commons licenses. On its website CC also provides case studies of projects using CC licenses across the world. CC licensed content can also be accessed through a number of content directories and search engines.

ccHost - Server web software used by ccMixter and Open Clip Art Library
Common Content - now offline  (accessed 16 November 2007).
Creative Commons' Content Directories
Creative Commons' Search Page
Google Advanced Search - select an option under Usage Rights, to search for CC content
Mozilla Firefox web browser with default Creative Commons search functionality
Open Game Art - Sound and graphics repository intended for use in free software video games
The Internet Archive - Project dedicated to maintaining an archive of multimedia resources, among which Creative Commons-licensed content
Yahoo's Creative Commons Search

News and media 
 The Conversation - Content is sourced from the academic and research community. Site content is under a Creative Commons — Attribution/No derivatives license.
 Aeon.co - Aeon ideas are interesting pieces and thought narratives republishable online or in print under their Creative Commons licence.
 Singularity Hub - Providing news coverage of sci/tech breakthroughs, certain articles can be republished for free in any language, online or in print, under the Creative Commons license CC BY-ND 4.0.
 ProPublica - A nonprofit newsroom that produces investigative journalism. Articles and graphics can be republished for free under CC BY-NC-ND 3.0 US.
 Futurism - Future news site with all content licensed under Creative Commons for Attribution-Non-Commercial Use.

Audio and music
CCMixter - A Creative Commons Remix community site
Dogmazic -  Archive of free music based in France, one of the main actor of free music movement in Europe
Electrobel - A Creative Commons Community for Belgium, France, Netherlands, UK, Italy
Jamendo - An archive of music albums under Creative Commons licenses 
Directory.Audio - A community collaborative, free database of sound effects, music and audio intros released under a Creative Commons license
Newgrounds Audio portal - All the music submitted to the Newgrounds Audio portal is free to use under BY-NC-SA 3.0.

Photos and images
Newgrounds Art portal - Artists who submit art to the Newgrounds Art portal may choose to use a Creative Commons licence.
Open Clip Art Library
Pixabay - Provides public domain photos, illustrations, vector graphics, and film footage
FreeSVG.org - Provides public domain (CC0) vector images in SVG format
Creativevectors.org - Provides vector images with Creative Commons licences.

References

External links 
Creative Commons Content Directories

 
Computer law
Free music
Copyleft